Goldbuster is a 2017 Chinese comedy film produced by Peter Chan and directed by Sandra Ng. The film stars Sandra Ng, Francis Ng, Alex Fong, Shen Teng, Zhang Yi, Jiang Yilei, and Yue Yunpeng. The film picks up the stories between a real estate owner and the nail-house holders. The film premiered in China on 29 December 2017.

Cast
 Sandra Ng as Sister Ling
 Francis Ng as Ah Ming, a faded lowbrow.
 Alex Fong as Ah Ren, a faded lowbrow.
 Shen Teng as Xu Dafu, a real estate owner.
 Zhang Yi as Wang Baojian
 Jiang Yilei as Li Juhua, an inventor.
 Yue Yunpeng as Xu Tianyu, Xu Dafu's son.
 Pan Binlong as Jin San, husband of Li Juhua.
 Li Yihang as Ji Ding
 Jiao Junyan as Ah Ping, a network host.
 Ah Runa as Zhao Dianpao
 Xu Juncong as Zhang Yonggan
 Zhao Yingjun
 Ma Sichun

Soundtrack

Production
The film is Sandra Ng's directorial debut.

This film was shot mostly on location in Panyu District of Guangzhou, Guangdong, China.

Release
Goldbuster was released on December 29, 2017 in China, and on January 5, 2018 in the United States.

Reception
Douban gave the film 4.3 out of 10.

Box office
Goldbuster earned a total of 300 million yuan in its first 4 days of release.

References

External links
 
 
 

2017 films
2010s Mandarin-language films
2010s Cantonese-language films
Films shot in Guangdong
Chinese comedy films
2017 comedy films